Until 1 January 2007 Græsted-Gilleleje was a municipality (Danish, kommune) in Frederiksborg County on the north coast of the island of Zealand (Sjælland) in eastern Denmark. The municipality covered an area of 134 km², and had a total population of 20,936 (2005).  Its last mayor was Jannich Petersen, a member of the Venstre (Liberal Party) political party. The main town and the site of its municipal council was the town of Gilleleje.

Græsted-Gilleleje municipality ceased to exist due to Kommunalreformen ("The Municipality Reform" of 2007).  It was combined with Helsinge municipality to form the new Gribskov municipality.  This created a municipality with an area of 278 km² and a total population of 40,409 (2005).  The new municipality belongs to Region Hovedstaden ("Capital Region").

See also 
 Holbo Herred

External links
 Municipality's official website
 Gilleleje tourism information

References  
 Municipal statistics: NetBorger Kommunefakta, delivered from KMD aka Kommunedata (Municipal Data)
 Municipal mergers and neighbors: Eniro new municipalities map

Former municipalities of Denmark